The 2017 Asian Beach Handball Championship was the 6th edition of the Asian Beach Handball Championship held from 8 to 15 May 2017 at Pattaya, Thailand under the aegis of Asian Handball Federation. It also acts as the qualification tournament for the 2018 Beach Handball World Championships.

Format
In men's category the tournament was played on the round-robin-cum-knockout format. A team had to play match with all the other teams in group stage. Top two teams from each group will advance to semifinals. In women's category the tournament was played in a round-robin format and final standings in the group are final positions.

Matches were played in sets, the team that wins two sets is the winner of a match. When teams were equal in points the head-to-head result was decisive.

Men

Participating nations
 
 
 
 
  (Defending Champion)
  (Host)

Group A

Group B

5th–8th-place matches

Final matches

Final standings

Women

Participating nations
 
 
  (Defending Champion) (Host)

Round-Robin

Final standings

References

External links
 asianhandball.com

Beach handball competitions